

2002

See also
 2002 in Australia
 2002 in Australian television
 List of 2002 box office number-one films in Australia

2002
Australian
Films